Hannah Fay Taylor (born 30 April 1998) is a Canadian freestyle wrestler. Taylor competed for Canada at the 2019 Pan American Games, and at the Pan American Wrestling Championships she won the silver medal in 2019 and 2020. She won one of the bronze medals in the women's 57 kg event at the 2022 Commonwealth Games held in Birmingham, England. She is a member of the women's wrestling team at Brock University.

Personal life 
Taylor was born in Charlottetown, Prince Edward Island and raised in Cornwall, Prince Edward Island. She currently resides in the Niagara Region and studies sport management at Brock University.

She obtained her high school diploma from Three Oaks Senior High School, located in Summerside, Prince Edward Island.

Career 

In 2013, Taylor competed for Prince Edward Island (PEI) in wrestling at the 2013 Canada Summer Games, where she won a silver medal, and she was the flag-bearear for the province at the opening ceremonies of the games. She later represented PEI in the sport of judo at the 2015 Canada Winter Games, due to being unable to find a training partner for wrestling in her weight class.

She currently competes for Canada in the 57kg weight class and for the Brock University Badgers in the 63kg weight class (previously in the 59kg weight class).

In late 2019, she was defeated by Linda Morais in the 57kg finals of the Canadian Wrestling Trials, thereby failing to secure an entry into the Pan-Am Olympic Qualification Tournament in Ottawa.

U SPORTS 

In 2017, she was named the rookie of the year by U SPORTS and that same year, claimed a gold medal at the Ontario University Athletics (OUA) wrestling championships.

From 2016-2017 to 2019-2020, she received a gold medal three times at the national level (U SPORTS Wrestling Championships) and four times at the provincial level (OUA Wrestling Championships).

International competitions 

In 2019, she represented Canada at the 2019 Pan American Games held in Lima, Peru in the 57 kg event where she was eliminated in her first match by Giullia Penalber of Brazil. Penalber went on to win one of the bronze medals. Later that year, Taylor also competed in the 57 kg event at the 2019 World Wrestling Championships where she was eliminated in her first match by Jong In-sun.

In 2019, she also competed at the 2019 World U23 Wrestling Championship where she won one of the bronze medals in the 57 kg event. Two years later, she also won one of the bronze medals in the 57 kg event at the 2021 U23 World Wrestling Championships held in Belgrade, Serbia.

She won one of the bronze medals in the women's 57 kg event at the 2022 Commonwealth Games held in Birmingham, England. She competed in the 57kg event at the 2022 World Wrestling Championships held in Belgrade, Serbia.

Achievements

References

External links 
 

1998 births
Living people
Sportspeople from Charlottetown
Canadian female sport wrestlers
Wrestlers at the 2019 Pan American Games
Pan American Games competitors for Canada
Pan American Wrestling Championships medalists
Wrestlers at the 2022 Commonwealth Games
Commonwealth Games bronze medallists for Canada
Commonwealth Games medallists in wrestling
20th-century Canadian women
21st-century Canadian women
Medallists at the 2022 Commonwealth Games